Ebbers is a Dutch and Low German patronymic surname originating in the Achterhoek and neighboring areas in North Rhine-Westphalia. The given name Ebbe can be a short form of Egbert or "Eber-" names like Eberhard.

People with this name include:

 Bernard Ebbers (1941–2020), Canadian businessman convicted of securities fraud
 Denny Ebbers (1974–2015), Dutch judoka
 Marius Ebbers (born 1978), German footballer

See also
 Ebbers, Edmonton, a neighborhood in northeast Edmonton, Alberta, Canada, built on the land of Dutch immigrant dairy farmer Johan/John Rudolph Ebbers (born 1895, Aalten).

References

Dutch-language surnames
Low German surnames
Patronymic surnames